The Ethiopian Air Force (ETAF) is the air service branch of the Ethiopian National Defence Force. The ETAF is tasked with protecting the national air space, providing support to ground forces, as well as assisting civil operations during national emergencies.

History

Early years (1929–1935) 

The origins of the Ethiopian Air Force has been traced to (then Ras) Haile Selassie witnessing a show of the British Royal Air Force in November 1922, in Aden. Having never seen an airplane before, he was captivated by this demonstration of their power and abilities, and spontaneously asked if he could go up in one of the biplanes, proclaiming that it was "very fitting that he, as regent of Abyssinia should be the first Abyssinian to take flight in an aeroplane." As a result of this experience, he advocated the development of the Imperial Ethiopian Air Force. This small air arm began with the delivery of a Potez 25-A2 to the capital Addis Ababa on 18 August 1929. A Junkers W 33c followed on 5 September. The Ethiopian Air Force was organized by Mishka Babitchef, the first Ethiopian pilot, who was of Russian descent.

On 31 March 1930, three of the biplanes from Ethiopia's air arm played a dramatic role in a battle between Haile Selassie (not yet crowned Emperor) and conservative forces seeking to oust him. During the Battle of Anchem, biplanes were effectively used to give Haile Selassie's forces the upper hand.

A few transport aircraft were also acquired during 1934–35 for ambulance work. The air force was commanded by Colonel John Robinson (African-American, took command May 1935), recruited by Haile Selassie, and who remained until the Italian conquest of Ethiopia when the small air arm ceased to exist.

 2 × Beechcraft Staggerwing
 1 × Breda Ba.15
 1 × de Havilland DH.60 Moth
 1 × de Havilland Dragon (Red Cross)
 1 × Farman 192 c/n?
 1 × Farman F.190 converted to F192 by engine change, c/n?
 1 × Fiat AS-1, lost in accident 1930
 2 × Fokker F.VIIa (Named "Abba Dagnew" and "Abba Kagnew". The latter was used as ambulance)
 1 × Fokker F.VIIb/3m (used as Hailé Sélassié's personal transport, and for missions by the Red Cross)
 1 × Heinkel HD.21 (Red Cross)
 1 × Junkers W33c (acquired in 1929).
 6 × Potez 25A-2
 1 × Meindl van Nes A.VII Ethiopia 1.
 1 Breda Ba.25.
 1 Breda Ba.28.
 2 Breguet XIX.

Notable pilots of the Imperial Ethiopian Air Force (1929–1936)

 André Maillet (French)
 Gaston Vedel
 Baron von Engel (German)
 Comte Schatzberg
 Hubert Julian
 Mishka Babitcheff (Ethiopian)
 Bahru Kaba (Ethiopian)
 Asfaw Ali (Ethiopian)
 Tesfaye (Ethiopian)
 John Robinson (African-American, took command May 1935)
 Thierry Maignal
 Ludwig Weber (Agent of Junkers in Addis Ababa and personal pilot of Hailé Sélassié, he supervised the construction of the Weber Meindl van Nes A.VII Ethiopia 1 which was a highly modified version of the de Havilland DH.60 Moth
 Count Carl Gustaf von Rosen (with the Red Cross, he flew the Heinkel HD.21)

Post-World War II 
After the liberation of Ethiopia, the country started reorganizing the embryonic air force that had existed prior to the Italian invasion, commanded by Colonel John Robinson (African-American). In 1944, a group of World War II African-American veterans set up a flying school at Lideta airport in Addis Ababa. The nation acquired a few aircraft through military aid from the United States and United Kingdom; and the school had some 75 students by 1946. As neither the United States nor the United Kingdom was interested in providing assistance, Ethiopia turned to Sweden to help create a modern air arm (see Ethiopia–Sweden relations). The Swedes agreed to provide assistance and Carl Gustaf von Rosen was appointed as the chief instructor of the newly re-formed Imperial Ethiopian Air Force (IEAF).

The Swedish contingent played a critical role in setting up a solid foundation. It sent Safir trainers and B-17A light bombers from Sweden, and the Ethiopian government acquired C-47 Skytrain transport aircraft from the United States to equip the flight training, bomber, and transport squadrons, respectively. In 1951, the IEAF formed its first fighter/attack squadron by acquiring Fairey Firefly fighters from the United Kingdom.

US assistance and transition to the jet age 
In 1953, a military agreement was entered between the United States and Ethiopia for a military assistance program (see Ethiopia–United States relations). It aimed to provide Ethiopia with a capable military force for defensive purposes. The US military sent a team to undertake a comprehensive study of the Ethiopian military capabilities, requirements, and probable threats facing Ethiopia.

The IEAF benefited immensely from the program. The US Air Force sent a team of officers and NCOs led by a Colonel to assess the force and provide recommendations as part of the Military Advisory and Assistance Group undertaking the comprehensive study of the Ethiopian military. The IEAF was to be restructured organizationally and adopt US-style operating procedures. Emphasis was given to building up IEAF's training institutions. Several Ethiopian personnel was sent to the US for training, including 25 Ethiopian pilots for jet training, and many more were trained locally by US Defense personnel. In 1957, the first three of several T-33A jet trainers were supplied followed by F-86F fighters in 1960. In 1961, T-28s were acquired for advanced training. This influx of equipment and training made the IEAF, in the opinion of historian Bahru Zewde, "the most prestigious show-piece of American aid in Ethiopia. It was also reputedly the most modern and efficient unit of the armed forces."

In 1964, the Somalis began receiving large quantities of weaponry, ground equipment, and MiG-17 fighters from the Soviet Union (see Ethiopia–Russia relations). In response, the US started delivering the supersonic F-5A jet fighters in 1965 to counter this new threat. However, it was careful not to escalate the situation further. The US delivered the F-5As without providing major weapon systems for the aircraft, the ability to use air-to-air missiles. Nevertheless, the delivery of F-5As had serious implications in the Horn of Africa because no neighboring country had anything similar to this new jet fighter. The Somalis were furious and described the F-5A transfer as a grave threat to the security of the Somali people and the rest of the Horn. In 1976, the US agreed to supply more advanced F-5Es along with AIM-9B sidewinder missiles after the Soviets delivered Mikoyan-Gurevich MiG-21 fighters to Somalia. The F-5E aircraft destined for Ethiopia was never delivered and was stored at Williams AFB, Arizona during the Ogaden War 1977–1978.

In 1977, Nos 1 and 2 Squadrons of the Ethiopian Air Force converted from the F-86 to the MiG-21, and No. 33 Operational Conversion Unit from the T-33A to the MiG-21UM and MiG-21MF; a year later, No. 3 Squadron converted from the F-86 to the Mikoyan-Gurevich MiG-23BN "Flogger." In 1980, No. 5 Squadron converted from F-86s to the MiG-21bis. Years later, all four squadrons, and 33 OCU, were reported to be based at Debre Zeit.

Ethiopian-Somali War

After its independence in 1960, Somalia started making claims to all of its precolonial territories that were occupied by France, Ethiopia, and the British. However, the majority of the land claimed was in Ethiopia which made it Somalia's main target. After failing to get support within the Organization of African Unity, Somalia declared war on Ethiopia in 1964. The Somali forces launched their attack at Togochale, a border town east of Jijiga, but the Ethiopians were no match to the comparatively well-equipped air forces of Somalia.
 
The brief conflict provided the IEAF with valuable experience. Lessons learned included the need for heavy bombers, an air defense complex, a secure and reliable communication system, and better coordination with ground forces. As a result, Canberra bombers and air defense radars were acquired from Great Britain and the US respectively.
In 1974, popular unrest against Emperor Haile Selassie led to a military coup. The military then formed a committee from within, known as the Derg, dominated by junior officers and NCOs. Shortly after, it executed 60 top civilian and military officials and imprisoned many others. In addition, the Derg forced out many career military officers it was suspicious of. The army was in shambles and the country was engulfed in political turmoil. It was during this moment the Somalis launched a massive invasion in 1977.
 
Already alarmed at the increasing noise the Somalis were making, the Derg government had managed to convince the Ford administration to provide Ethiopia with F-5Es in 1975. The first batch of six pilots were sent to Williams Air Force Base in Arizona for conversion and tactical fighter training in August 1976. However, further training of pilots and delivery of aircraft was stopped after President Carter cut off all arms supplies in protest of the Derg's human rights violations.

Using the eight F-5Es as interceptors, F-5As for close air support, and Canberra for heavy bombing, the ETAF overwhelmed the Somali Air Force. Throughout the war, it also conducted strikes against several targets deep inside Somalia, including the repeated bombings of the Somali Air Force's northern main operating base at Hargeisa and long range attack on the Berbera.
 
The ETAF lost three F-5Es to ground fire and one C-47 transport plane to a MIG-17 while one Canberra was flown by a defecting pilot to Somalia. Another Canberra was lost due to a mechanical problem deep inside Ethiopia after it suffered hits from a ground attack. Two F-5E pilots as well as the C-47 crew were captured by the Somalis while one F-5E pilot was rescued by helicopter. One of the F-5E pilots captured was Legesse Tefera (died 5 October 2016), credited with six (or 7) Somali MiG kills, making him the most successful F-5 pilot ever. His F-5E was shot down while overflying an area thought to be in control by Ethiopian forces. He was captured by the local Somali population and was turned over to then Somali army commander of the region, Colonel Abdullahi Yusuf, and held prisoner for over 10 years. Colonel Abdullahi Yusuf later became President of Somalia. The other captured F-5E pilot, Afework Kidanu, died while in captivity in Somalia.

Shift to the Eastern bloc 
While the ETAF's role was critical in stopping the advance of the Somali forces, the ground forces were not ready for offensive operations to expel the Somalis from the area they controlled. The army was short in equipment of all sorts, and after the Derg acquired power United States President Jimmy Carter cut off all military aid to Ethiopia. Desperate, the Derg regime turned to the Soviets for help. The Soviet Union, which was providing assistance to Somalia, switched sides and agreed to provide substantial economic and military aid that proved to be decisive. As a result, the Air Force received a large number of aircraft for fighter, helicopter, transport roles. The Cubans provided 17,000 troops to support the Ethiopian forces. Included were Cuban pilots who flew the newly Soviet-supplied MiG-21s.

In the 1980s, non-Soviet aircraft were also acquired. Several L-39C jets were acquired from Czechoslovakia for jet transition training. In addition, SF-260TP trainers were acquired from Italy in two batches to replace the aging Safirs, and two L-100 Hercules transport aircraft, the civilian version of the military C-130 Hercules transport, were acquired through Ethiopian Airlines (see Czechoslovakia-Ethiopia relations, Ethiopia-Italy relations).

The Derg years 

While its performance during the war with Somalia saved the ETAF from the purges inflicted on the army and nearly every other institution in the country, the Derg was determined to keep a close eye on it. To increase its control, the Derg created a three-man committee constituting the force commander, political commissar, and representative from the security service to oversee the air force. In addition, adhering to Soviet advice, the ETAF's organization was replaced by a Soviet-style regimental structure.

The Soviet influence had a major impact on the ETAF. The Soviets offered to train all pilots at a joint training center for all their satellite states leaving the ETAF responsible only for operational training. They also offered to train engineers at their schools. Expecting to realize enormous cost savings, the ETAF accepted the offer. As a result, both the flying school and Air Academy were closed in 1980 and all recruits were sent to the Soviet Union after passing aptitude test examination and medical screening.

Dissatisfied with the Soviet-provided training, the ETAF re-activated both its flight training school and Air Academy in 1984. SF260TP propeller aircraft for primary screening and L-39 jets for jet-transition training was acquired from Italy and Czechoslovakia respectively. The Air Academy was reopened using civilian instructors with degree programs in aeronautical engineering, aeronautical administration, and electrical engineering.

This period witnessed the decline of the ETAF's maintenance and engineering centers. Unlike the Americans, the Soviets were unwilling to transfer technical know-how. They insisted that every major repair work be undertaken by them in the Soviet Union. In addition to the logistical nightmare, the cost was prohibitive for the air force already financially stretched supporting the ground forces in the raging civil war. The Soviets relented and agreed to set up a depot-level maintenance, repair, and overhaul center after the Derg regime took up the matter with the Soviet leadership. However, lack of finance hindered the progress and only minimal work was done by 1991. The project was restarted in 1995 and formally inaugurated in 2004.

The Derg years saw the ETAF embroiled in the civil war. The ETAF played a critical role in the Derg's war effort in the north. It was the main stumbling block the rebels faced from achieving total victory. However, in the late 1980s, many in the air force began questioning the prosecution of the war. Following a failed coup in 1989, in which the ETAF's top leaders participated, its high command was decimated with arrests and executions. As a result, the ETAF was suffering from low morale and serious internal rifts. Pilots were defecting in increasing numbers to neighboring countries. The situation on the ground was also becoming hopeless. Eventually, the forces of the Ethiopian People's Revolutionary Democratic Front (EPRDF) overran the Derg's army and took control of the country in 1991.

After 1991 

The change of events that followed had a tremendous impact on the ETAF. In 1991, the Soviet-backed Derg regime was deposed by EPRDF rebel forces. The EPRDF ordered all members of the military, including those of the ETAF, to report to detention camps set up throughout the country. The EPRDF started reorganizing the air force soon after taking power. Shortly after taking complete control of the country, it selected about 50 officers and NCOs from the rehabilitation camps to reactivate a transport wing. In addition, more pilots and ground crew were returned to bring back the assets that were flown to neighboring countries by fleeing pilots in the final days of the Derg.

The EPRDF government was cognizant of the critical role of airpower, having experienced it first hand during its long war with Derg. It set up a new high command which included senior EPRDF military commanders and former members of the ETAF who have previously joined the EPRDF. Its primary task was to restore the ETAF to operational status.

In August 1992, the flying school was reopened and training of cadets was resumed. As a result, many of the instructor pilots under the Derg regime were allowed to return. In addition, senior EPRDF commanders assigned to the high command were sent abroad for staff training. The first batch of pilot trainees graduated in June 1995 which continued yearly afterward. However, the early period was fraught with much friction and mistrust between the retained personnel from the former Derg regime and the EPRDF military commanders assigned to ETAF.

In 1995, the EPRDF government unveiled a plan for a new Ethiopian National Defense Force. The plan called for a smaller air force with a streamlined organizational structure and fewer bases. As a medium term solution, the ETAF's air and ground assets were to be upgraded with modern systems, and completion of the maintenance and overhaul centers started under the Derg. However, lack of finance delayed the implementation of most projects. The political leadership felt there was no threat to speak of facing the country to justify large expenditures, particularly pertaining to the extensive (and expensive) upgrade project for the MIG-21/23 fighter fleet.

The unexpected outbreak of war with Eritrea in June 1998 led to a significant change in the ETAF. The entire Ethiopian National Defense Force was ill-prepared for the conflict. Most of the Ethiopian Ground Forces were located in the south and southeast. The EPRDF government considered the northern borders to be the most secure due to its then close relationship with Eritrea and had decided to leave the border security in the hands of the local militia and police forces. The case with the ETAF was no different which never had replaced its northern command base it lost when Eritrea seceded.

In the two years that followed from 1998 to 2000 and despite the many constraints, the ETAF was able to provide crucial support to the ground forces. Su-27 air superiority fighters were acquired along with advanced versions of the Mi-35 helicopter gunships. The Su-27s were used to shoot down four Eritrean Air Force MIG-29s; the first on 25 February 1999, and the second on 26 February 1999. In return, Eritrean MiG-29s shot down a total of two MiG-21 and one MiG-23 fighters during the war. Lessons learned from the war were incorporated throughout which increased the effectiveness of the ETAF in the second year of the war. Su-25T jets with precision strike capability were acquired along with sophisticated electronic warfare systems. Its members undertook dangerous missions deep inside Eritrean territory from interdicting supply lines, reconnaissance, and destruction of air defense systems. This in turn greatly raised the morale of the Ethiopian army which enabled them to break the highly fortified Eritrean front line in an amazingly short period of time. Hence, changing the tide of the war back in the Eritrean heartland.

After the war, the ETAF was reorganized to better prepare it for future conflicts based on lessons learned during the 1998–2000 war. Changes were made to better reflect in its doctrine the effects of the newer equipments acquired ability to deploy precision guided munitions. The long running maintenance and overhaul center project, DAVEC, was also sped up and inaugurated in 2004.

Tigray War
In early November 2020 a conflict broke out in the Tigray Region of Ethiopia between forces loyal to the Tigray People's Liberation Front (TPLF) and the ENDF. The ETAF would almost immediately start carrying out airstrikes on TPLF targets bombing arms depots, military bases, and other targets. Airstrikes have continued throughout the course of the war and caused civilian casualties. On 16 November 2020, a series of airstrikes on the city of Wukro would inflict 14 civilian deaths. On 22 June 2021, an Ethiopian fighter plane bombed a market in the town Togoga killing 64 civilians and wounding 180 more.

Several ETAF aircraft have also been shot down. On 29 November 2020, an ETAF Mig-23 was shot down by the TPLF leading to the capture of the pilot. On 20 April 2021, an ETAF Mil Mi-35 was shot down near Guya killing three crew members. On 23 June 2021 an ETAF Lockheed L-100 Hercules was shot down near Gijet.

Organisation

 7 fighter ground attack squadrons: MiG-21, MiG-23, Su-25, Su-27
 1 transport squadron: An-12, An-32, B-757, C-130B/E, L-100-30, Mi-8, Mi-24, Alouette III
 1 training squadron: L-39, SF.260

Air bases 

The primary base is at Harar Meda Airport, in Bishoftu. There are four smaller bases used by the air force, these are:
Bahir Dar Airport
Aba Tenna Dejazmach Yilma International Airport in Dire Dawa
Gode Airport
Alula Aba Nega Airport in Mek'ele

Aircraft

Current inventory 

In addition to the Air Force inventory, the Ethiopian Army operates two DHC-6, and eight Bell 205 helicopters.

Retired aircraft 
Previous notable aircraft operated by Ethiopia were the  Lockheed T-33,  Northrop F-5,  MiG-17,  Electric Canberra,  Douglas C-54,  Fairchild C-119, de Havilland Dove, Mil Mi-6, Mil Mi-14,  Aérospatiale SA 330,  North American T-28 Saab 91 Safir, and Saab 17

Major Incidents 
In 2013, an Ethiopian military cargo plane crashed on landing at Mogadishu airport in Somalia, killing four of the six crew members.

On 30 August 2018, a DHC-6 military aircraft operating as flight 808 (ET-AIU), carrying 15 members of the defense force and 3 civilians, crashed twenty minutes away from landing at Harar Meda Airport in Bishoftu after taking off from Dire Dawa. No survivors were reported.
	
On June 23, 2021 a Lockheed L-100 Hercules crashed near Gijet, Ethiopia. Unconfirmed reports indicated the aircraft was downed by the Tigray Defense Forces during an on going armed conflict that started in November 2020 between Ethiopia and the Tigray Region.

Roundels

See also 
Ethiopian National Defense Force
Ethiopian Navy

References

Bibliography
 Gordon, Yefim and Alan Dawes. Sukhoi Su-25 Frogfoot: Close Air Support Aircraft. London: Airlife, 2004. .

Further reading
Tom Cooper, African MiGs: MiGs and Sukhois in Service in Sub-Saharan Africa, Welcome to the Air Combat Information Group, SHI Publications, 2004, Softbound, 158 Pages

External links
A history of the Ethiopian Air Force (dehai-news)

 
Military units and formations established in 1929